National Secondary Route 222, or just Route 222 (or ) is a National Road Route of Costa Rica, located in the San José, Cartago provinces.

Description
In San José province the route covers Desamparados canton (Frailes, San Cristóbal, Rosario districts), Aserrí canton (Tarbaca, San Gabriel districts).

In Cartago province the route covers Cartago canton (Corralillo district), El Guarco canton (San Isidro district).

References

Highways in Costa Rica